Romain Gary (2 December 1980), born Roman Kacew (and also known by the pen name Émile Ajar), was a French novelist, diplomat, film director, and World War II aviator. He is the only author to have won the Prix Goncourt under two names. He is considered a major writer of French literature of the second half of the 20th century. He was married to Lesley Blanch, then Jean Seberg.

Early life 
Gary was born Roman Kacew ( Roman Katsev, Roman Leibovich Katsev) in Vilnius (at that time in the Russian Empire). In his books and interviews, he presented many different versions of his parents' origins, ancestry, occupation and his own childhood. His mother, Mina Owczyńska (1879—1941), was a Jewish actress from Švenčionys (Svintsyán) and his father was a businessman named Arieh-Leib Kacew (1883—1942) from Trakai (Trok), also a Lithuanian Jew. The couple broke in 1925 and Arieh-Leib remarried. Gary later claimed that his actual father was the celebrated actor and film star Ivan Mosjoukine, with whom his actress mother had worked and to whom he bore a striking resemblance. Mosjoukine appears in his memoir Promise at Dawn.  Deported to central Russia in 1915, they stayed in Moscow until 1920. They later returned to Vilnius, then moved on to Warsaw. When Gary was fourteen, he and his mother emigrated illegally to Nice, France. Converted to Catholicism by his mother, Gary studied law, first in Aix-en-Provence and then in Paris. He learned to pilot an aircraft in the French Air Force in Salon-de-Provence and in Avord Air Base, near Bourges.

Career
Of almost 300 cadets in his class, and despite completing all parts of his course successfully, Gary was the only one not to be commissioned as an officer. He believed that the military establishment was distrustful of what they saw as a foreigner and a Jew.  Training on Potez 25 and Goëland Léo-20 aircraft, and with 250 hours flying time, only after three months' delay was he made a sergeant on 1 February 1940.  Lightly wounded on 13 June 1940 in a Bloch MB.210, he was disappointed with the armistice; after hearing General de Gaulle's radio appeal, he decided to go to England.  After failed attempts, he flew to Algiers from Saint-Laurent-de-la-Salanque in a Potez.  Made adjutant upon joining the Free French and serving on Bristol Blenheims, he saw action across Africa and was promoted to second lieutenant.  He returned to England to train on Boston IIIs.  On 25 January 1944, his pilot was blinded, albeit temporarily, and Gary talked him to the bombing target and back home, the third landing being successful.  This and the subsequent BBC interview and Evening Standard newspaper article were an important part of his career.  He finished the war as a captain in the London offices of the Free French Air Forces.  As a bombardier-observer in the Groupe de bombardement Lorraine (No. 342 Squadron RAF), he took part in over 25 successful sorties, logging over 65 hours of air time. During this time, he changed his name to Romain Gary. He was decorated for his bravery in the war, receiving many medals and honours, including Compagnon de la Libération and commander of the Légion d'honneur. In 1945 he published his first novel, Éducation européenne. Immediately following his service in the war, he worked in the French diplomatic service in Bulgaria and Switzerland. In 1952 he became the secretary of the French Delegation to the United Nations. In 1956, he became Consul General in Los Angeles and became acquainted with Hollywood.

As Émile Ajar 
In a memoir published in 1981, Gary's nephew Paul Pavlowitch claimed that Gary also produced several works under the pseudonym Émile Ajar. Gary recruited Pavlowitch to portray Ajar in public appearances, allowing Gary to remain unknown as the true producer of the Ajar works, and thus enabling him to win the 1975 Goncourt Prize, a second win in violation of the prize's usual rules.

Gary also published under the pseudonyms Shatan Bogat and Fosco Sinibaldi.

Literary work

Gary became one of France's most popular and prolific writers, writing more than 30 novels, essays and memoirs, some of which he wrote under a pseudonym.

He is the only person to win the Prix Goncourt twice. This prize for French language literature is awarded only once to an author. Gary, who had already received the prize in 1956 for Les racines du ciel, published La vie devant soi under the pseudonym Émile Ajar in 1975. The Académie Goncourt awarded the prize to the author of that book without knowing his identity. Gary's cousin's son Paul Pavlowitch posed as the author for a time. Gary later revealed the truth in his posthumous book Vie et mort d'Émile Ajar. Gary also published as Shatan Bogat, René Deville and Fosco Sinibaldi, as well under his birth name Roman Kacew.

In addition to his success as a novelist, he wrote the screenplay for the motion picture The Longest Day and co-wrote and directed the film Kill! (1971), which starred his wife at the time, Jean Seberg. In 1979, he was a member of the jury at the 29th Berlin International Film Festival.

Diplomatic career 
After the end of the hostilities, Gary began a career as a diplomat in the service of France, in consideration of the services rendered for his release. In this capacity, he held positions in Bulgaria (1946–1947), Paris (1948–1949), Switzerland (1950–1951), New York (1951–1954) — at the Permanent Mission of France to the United Nations, where he regularly rubs shoulders with the Jesuit Teilhard de Chardin, whose personality deeply marked him and inspired him, particularly for the character of Father Tassin in Les Racines du ciel—in London (1955), then as Consul General of France in Los Angeles (1956–1960). Back in Paris, he remained unassigned until he was laid off from the Ministry of Foreign Affairs (1961).

Personal life and final years

Gary's first wife was the British writer, journalist, and Vogue editor Lesley Blanch, author of The Wilder Shores of Love. They married in 1944 and divorced in 1961. From 1962 to 1970, Gary was married to American actress Jean Seberg, with whom he had a son, Alexandre Diego Gary. According to Diego Gary, he was a distant presence as a father: "Even when he was around, my father wasn't there. Obsessed with his work, he used to greet me, but he was elsewhere."

After learning that Jean Seberg had had an affair with Clint Eastwood, Gary challenged him to a duel, but Eastwood declined.

Gary died of a self-inflicted gunshot wound on 2 December 1980 in Paris. He left a note which said that his death had no relation to Seberg's suicide the previous year. He also stated in his note that he was Émile Ajar.

Gary was cremated in Père Lachaise Cemetery and his ashes were scattered in the Mediterranean Sea near Roquebrune-Cap-Martin.

Legacy 
The name of Romain Gary was given to a promotion of the École nationale d'administration (2003–2005), the Institut d'études politiques de Lille (2013), the Institut régional d'administration de Lille (2021–2022) and the Institut d'études politiques de Strasbourg (2001–2002), in 2006 at Place Romain-Gary in the 15th arrondissement of Paris and at the Nice Heritage Library. The French Institute in Jerusalem also bears the name of Romain Gary.

On 16 May 2019, his work appeared in two volumes in the Bibliothèque de la Pléiade under the direction of Mireille Sacotte.

In 2007, a statue of Romualdas Kvintas, «The Boy with a Galoche», was unveiled, depicting the 9-year-old little hero of the Promise of Dawn, preparing to eat a shoe to seduce his little neighbor, Valentina. It is placed in Vilnius, in front of the Basanavičius, where the novelist lived.

A plaque to his name is affixed in the Pouillon building of the Faculty of Law and Political Science of Aix-Marseille where he studied.

In 2022, Denis Ménochet portrayed Gary in White Dog (Chien blanc), a film adaptation by Anaïs Barbeau-Lavalette of Gary's 1970 book.

Bibliography

As Romain Gary 
  (1945); translated as Forest of Anger
  (1946); republished and modified in 1970.
 Le Grand Vestiaire (1949); translated as The Company of Men (1950)
 Les Couleurs du jour (1952); translated as The Colors of the Day (1953); filmed as The Man Who Understood Women (1959)
 Les Racines du ciel — 1956 Prix Goncourt; translated as The Roots of Heaven (1957); filmed as The Roots of Heaven (1958)
 Lady L (1958); self-translated and published in French in 1963; filmed as Lady L (1965)
 La Promesse de l'aube (1960); translated as Promise at Dawn (1961); filmed as Promise at Dawn (1970) and again in 2017
 Johnie Cœur (1961, a theatre adaptation of "L'homme à la colombe")
 Gloire à nos illustres pionniers (1962, short stories); translated as "Hissing Tales" (1964)
 The Ski Bum (1965); self-translated into French as Adieu Gary Cooper (1969)
 Pour Sganarelle (1965, literary essay)
 Les Mangeurs d'étoiles (1966); self-translated into French and first published (in English) as The Talent Scout (1961)
 La Danse de Gengis Cohn (1967); self-translated into English as The Dance of Genghis Cohn
 La Tête coupable (1968); translated as The Guilty Head (1969)
 Chien blanc (1970); self-translated as White Dog (1970); filmed as White Dog (1982)
 Les Trésors de la mer Rouge (1971)
 Europa (1972); translated in English in 1978.
 The Gasp (1973); self-translated into French as Charge d'âme (1978)
 Les Enchanteurs (1973); translated as The Enchanters (1975)
 La nuit sera calme (1974, interview)
 Au-delà de cette limite votre ticket n'est plus valable (1975); translated as Your Ticket Is No Longer Valid (1977); filmed as Your Ticket Is No Longer Valid (1981)
 Clair de femme (1977); filmed as Womanlight (1979)
 La Bonne Moitié (1979, play)
 Les Clowns lyriques (1979); new version of the 1952 novel, Les Couleurs du jour (The Colors of the Day)
 Les Cerfs-volants (1980); translated as The Kites (2017)
 Vie et Mort d'Émile Ajar (1981, posthumous)
 L'Homme à la colombe (1984, definitive posthumous version)
 L'Affaire homme (2005, articles and interviews)
 L'Orage (2005, short stories and unfinished novels)
 Un humaniste, short story

As Émile Ajar 
 Gros câlin (1974); illustrated by Jean-Michel Folon, filmed as Gros câlin (1979)
 La vie devant soi — 1975 Prix Goncourt; filmed as Madame Rosa (1977); translated as "Momo" (1978); re-released as The Life Before Us (1986). Filmed as The Life Ahead (2020)
 Pseudo (1976)
 L'Angoisse du roi Salomon (1979); translated as King Solomon (1983).
 Gros câlin – new version including final chapter of the original and never published version.

As Fosco Sinibaldi 
 L'homme à la colombe (1958)

As Shatan Bogat 
 Les têtes de Stéphanie (1974)

Filmography

As screenwriter 
1958: The Roots of Heaven
1962: The Longest Day
1978: La vie devant soi

As actor 
1936: Nitchevo – Le jeune homme au bastingage
1967: The Road to Corinth – (uncredited) (final film role)

As director 
1968: Birds in Peru (Birds in Peru) starring Jean Seberg
1971: Kill! Kill! Kill! Kill! also starring Jean Seberg

In popular culture 
2019: Seberg , joué par Yvan Attal

References

Further reading
 Ajar, Émile (Romain Gary), Hocus Bogus, Yale University Press, 2010, 224p,  (translation of Pseudo by David Bellos, includes The Life and Death of Émile Ajar)
 Anissimov, Myriam, Romain Gary, le caméléon (Denoël 2004)
 Bellos, David, Romain Gary: A Tall Story, Harvill Secker, 2010, 528p, 
 Bellos, David. 2009. The cosmopolitanism of Romain Gary. Darbair ir Dienos (Vilnius) 51:63–69.
 Gary, Romain, Promise at Dawn (Revived Modern Classic), W.W. Norton, 1988, 348p, 
 Huston, Nancy, Tombeau de Romain Gary (Babel, 1997) 
 Bona, Dominique, Romain Gary (Mercure de France, 1987) 
 Cahier de l'Herne, Romain Gary (L'Herne, 2005)
 Désérable, François-Henri, Un certain M. Piekielny, Gallimard, 2017, 
 
 Blanch, Lesley, Romain, un regard particulier (Editions du Rocher, 2009) 
 Marret, Carine, Romain Gary – Promenade à Nice (Baie des Anges, 2010)
 Marzorati, Michel (2018).  Romain Gary: des racines et des ailes.  Info-Pilote, 742 pp. 30–33
 Spire, Kerwin, Monsieur Romain Gary, Gallimard, 2021, 
 Stjepanovic-Pauly, Marianne.  Romain Gary La mélancolie de l'enchanteur.  ''Editions du Jasmin,

External links

 

1914 births
1980 deaths
Film people from Vilnius
People from Vilensky Uyezd
French people of Lithuanian-Jewish descent
Lithuanian Jews
Jews from the Russian Empire
20th-century French diplomats
20th-century French novelists
French male novelists
Jewish novelists
Postmodern writers
20th-century French male writers
Prix Goncourt winners
French Royal Air Force pilots of World War II
Suicides by firearm in France
1980 suicides
Writers from Vilnius
Jews in the French resistance
French Resistance members